Q Radio is a network of radio stations in Northern Ireland airing an adult contemporary format. The network is the fifth most listened to radio station in Northern Ireland, with a combined figure of over 226,000 listeners as of December 2022, according to RAJAR.

Network
Q Radio covers seven licence areas:
Belfast - 96.7 & 102.5 FM and DAB
North West - 102.9 FM
North Coast - 97.2 & 97.6 FM
Mid Antrim - 107.0 & 107.6 FM
Mid Ulster - 106.0, 106.3 & 107.2 FM
Newry & Mourne - 100.5 FM & 101.1 FM
Tyrone & Fermanagh - 101.2 & 102.1 FM

The various stations in the network previously had local opt-outs from the network schedule, including the Q Cafe on weekdays between 10 a.m. and 1 p.m. There are currently no opt-outs on the schedule with all stations taking the network at all times, except for local news, traffic and advertising.

History

The first use of the Q brand in Northern Ireland came with the launch of Q97.2 from Coleraine, County Londonderry, on 26 January 2000. Additional stations were opened in Derry (Q102.9) and Omagh, County Tyrone (Q101.2).

Further stations that would later become part of Q Radio launched in the mid-2000s. Seven FM launched on 1 November 2005 from its base in Ballymena., while Five FM won a licence to broadcast to Newry and Mourne on 100.5 MHz in 2006, signing on 12 December. That same year, River Media bought Mid 106 FM in Cookstown from CN Group and rebranded it as Six FM. In 2011, Five FM, Six FM and Seven FM were rebranded as Q Radio stations.

In 2015, Q Radio acquired CityBeat in Belfast from CN Group, marking its entry into that market. The station was then rebranded as Q Radio Belfast.

In 2017, "QHQ", the network's main studios, were opened in Belfast's Fountain Centre. A series of licence extensions in 2018 brought Q Radio additional coverage in Northern Ireland, including transmitters covering Larne, Newcastle, Draperstown, Enniskillen and Ballycastle.

Presenters/former presenters 

 Stephen Clements
Gareth Stewart
Gareth Woods
Ryan A
Steve Turnbull
Jordan Humphries
Yazz
Cate Conway
Owen Larkin
Mark Lima
Carl Kinsman
Eoghan Quigg
Sean Hegarty
Declan Wilson
Ibe Sesay
Connor Brennan
Victoria Quinn
Sean Mckeown
Errol Doherty
Olga Kaye

References

External links
 Q Radio

Mass media in Belfast
Radio stations in Northern Ireland